Melanie R. White (born April 24, 1986) is an American designer from Yonkers, NY.

Early life 

White was born on April 24, 1986 and is from Yonkers, NY. She graduated from The Convent of the Sacred Heart in 2004.  She attended and graduated from Hampton University in 2008. She joined Delta Sigma Theta sorority's Gamma Iota chapter while attending Hampton University.

Career 

In 2009, she started her own accessories company named MELANIE MARiE. In 2010, she opened a boutique in Philadelphia on Temple's Campus called Greek & Life Boutique. Melanie is known best for her work with MELANIE MARiE.  It can be seen on dozens of celebrities and featured in numerous publications. She creates custom gold items for the biggest names and has collaborated with celebrities such as Beyonce, Ty Hunter, Adrienne Bailon and many more. She also known for her line of fashionable wearable technology items in which she has partnered with Metawear to create fashion forward technology pieces which will help people in everyday living.  Melanie was listed as the "Black Designer to Know" on Ebony. Cosmopolitan Magazine listed Melanie's line in their Christmas gift guide on what to buy for the holidays. Melanie also has been featured in many modeling ads and even music videos.

Filmography (including music videos & television shows)

References

External links 
 Official website
 AnnDrew Marie Custom Children Jewelry Website
 Melanie Marie Custom Jewelry website
 Melanie Marie Mobile Application website
 Greek & Life Boutique Inventory Site
 Greek & Life Boutique website

American jewelry designers
1986 births
Living people
Women jewellers